Le Journal de Saône-et-Loire is a French provincial daily newspaper for readers of the Saône-et-Loire département. Its headquarters are in Chalon-sur-Saône and it is printed in Chatenoy-le-Royal. It was established on July 2, 1826, in Mâcon.

Circulation in 2020: 46,253 weekday newspapers, 47,913 on Sundays.

Notes and references

Daily newspapers published in France
Mass media in Chalon-sur-Saône
1826 establishments in France
Publications established in 1826